The men's individual time trial event at the UCI Road World Championships is the men's world championship for the road bicycle racing discipline of time trial. Introduced in 1994 by the Union Cycliste Internationale (UCI), the world's governing body of cycling, the event consists of a time trial covering a distance of approximately 45 kilometres (28 mi) over flat or rolling terrain. Riders start separated by two-minute intervals; the one that completes the course in the shortest time is the winner, and is entitled to wear the rainbow jersey in time trial events for the forthcoming season.

Switzerland's Fabian Cancellara (2006, 2007, 2009 and 2010) and Germany's Tony Martin (2011, 2012, 2013 and 2016) have won the most competitions, with four each. Australia's Michael Rogers (2003, 2004 and 2005) is next by number of victories, with three wins; Martin and Rogers are the only people to have taken three wins in successive years. Bradley Wiggins is the oldest winner of the event, at 34 years and 149 days old when he won in 2014, while Rogers is the youngest winner, at 23 years and 293 days old when he won in 2003.

Germany's Michael Rich has finished second on three occasions, and is the most successful rider not to have won the event, with a total of four medals. Cancellara has the most third-place finishes, with three. German cyclists are the most successful, with seven victories, Swiss cyclists are second with five, and Australians are third with three. The current male champion is Norwegian rider Tobias Foss, who won the 2022 event.

History

Before 1994, the cyclists who performed well in the time trials during the three Grand Tours were considered the best in the world. The first event, at the 1994 UCI Road World Championships in Agrigento, Italy, was won by British cyclist Chris Boardman, ahead of Italy's Andrea Chiurato. Tour de France winner Miguel Induráin won the event the following year, beating fellow Spaniard Abraham Olano by forty-nine seconds. Alex Zülle, the 1996 Vuelta a España winner, won the rainbow jersey in his home country, ahead of Boardman and fellow Swiss cyclist Tony Rominger. The following year, Frenchman Laurent Jalabert beat Ukraine's Serhiy Honchar to the world title by three seconds in Valkenburg.  Olano won the event in 1998, beating his fellow Spaniard Melcior Mauri by thirty-seven seconds.

Germany's Jan Ullrich won the event in 1999, beating Swedish rider Michael Andersson by fourteen seconds around the  course in Treviso. Ullrich did not participate in the 2000 world championships in Plouay, and Honchar took the world title in his absence, beating Ullrich's countryman Michael Rich by ten seconds. The Ukrainian was happy to win the event after previous runner-up and third-place finishes: "I'm really satisfied, after the silver and bronze, I've finally got my World Championship." Ullrich returned the following year and reclaimed the rainbow jersey, beating Britain's David Millar by six seconds in Lisbon. Ullrich again decided against defending his title in 2002, leaving Santiago Botero to become the first Colombian to win a World Championship gold medal, as he beat Rich by eight seconds. Millar won the event in 2003; however, he was stripped of the title a year later after being found guilty of doping. Second-placed Michael Rogers was subsequently awarded the victory. He finished ahead of the next competitor, Uwe Peschel, by less than a second.

Rogers retained the title the following two years, finishing a minute and twelve seconds ahead of Rich in 2004, and twenty-three seconds ahead of Spain's Iván Gutiérrez in 2005. Rogers's run came to an end the following year, as Switzerland's Fabian Cancellara secured the victory in Salzburg, one minute and eighteen seconds ahead of American rider David Zabriskie. The Swiss defended his title in 2007, finishing ahead of Hungarian and Dutch cyclists László Bodrogi and Stef Clement. Germany's Bert Grabsch succeeded Cancellara, who was absent from the 2008 event in Varese, winning the title ahead of Canada's Svein Tuft and Zabriskie. Cancellara returned in 2009 and reclaimed the rainbow jersey after beating Sweden's Gustav Larsson and Germany's Tony Martin in Mendrisio. He won the rainbow jersey for a record fourth time the following year, with Millar and Martin finishing second and third, respectively. Cancellara was unsure whether he would compete beforehand, but stated: "It's maybe the hardest of all my wins because leading up to this I wasn't sure of my condition."

After two consecutive third-place finishes, Martin was victorious in 2011, beating Bradley Wiggins and defending champion Cancellara by a minute and fifteen seconds. He retained the rainbow jersey the following year; however, the margin of victory was considerably smaller as he beat the American Taylor Phinney by five seconds. In 2013, Martin won the event for a third consecutive time, again overcoming Wiggins and Cancellara. After two runner-up finishes, Wiggins prevented Martin's fourth successive win in the following season, taking the world title for the first time. Wiggins decided not to take part in 2015, focusing instead on breaking the hour record. In his absence, the winner was Belarusian cyclist Vasil Kiryienka, who came in third to Martin in 2012, beating Italy's Adriano Malori and France's Jérôme Coppel.

Medal winners

Most successful cyclists
The most successful cyclists are listed below and ranked by in order gold, silver and bronze medals won.

Medallists by nation
Nations are ranked in order of number of gold, silver and bronze medals won.

Footnotes

References

 
Men's Time Trial
Recurring sporting events established in 1994
Men's road bicycle races
Lists of UCI Road World Championships medalists